INS Shikra, formerly known as INS Kunjali, is an Indian naval air station located at Colaba in Mumbai, Maharashtra. It is a heliport.

History 
NAS Kunjali was commissioned as a new establishment in Mumbai, post-Independence. The locale chosen for the establishment was the old Gun Carriage Basin on the sea front in Colaba, in the heart of South Mumbai.  The area was used during the Second World War as a depot for munitions of war and as a boat repair facility. With the acquisition of Alouette III helicopters (now HAL Chetak) in 1963, the establishment was considered suitable for a helipad. The first time a helicopter operated from the base was on a temporary grass helipad in 1964. Alouette flights thereafter continued to operate from the helipad, on a makeshift and as required basis.

Finally, on 3 April 1972 ‘Bombay flight’ of the Goa-based INAS 321 was established with one Alouette III helicopter, two pilots and 17 sailors. On 1 August 1980, one more Chetak was added to the flight and the role of the squadron was enhanced to include VIP flight commitment, Fleet Requirement task including tracking for weapon alignment, casualty evacuation and SAR duties. With the introduction of helicopters on board ships, the base housed and operated these helicopters, when disembarked and a helicopter maintenance facility was set up in 1983.

The Naval Air Station was renamed to INS Shikra in an impressive commissioning ceremony presided over by the Chief of the Naval Staff, Admiral Sureesh Mehta, PVSM, AVSM, ADC on 22 January 2009. The commissioning commanding officer was Captain Philipose George Pynumootil.

Objective 
INS Shikra has grown from a small helipad to a full-fledged Heliport providing support and maintenance facilities to the integral flights of the fleet and aviation requirements of the Western Naval Command. The facilities continue to expand to cater for increasing numbers of helicopters being inducted on board ships. Its primary role is to provide administrative, technical and logistic support for all squadrons and flights based in Mumbai. In addition, it undertakes coastal patrol, air surveillance in the area and meets the operational flying requirements of the Western Naval Command.

It also has a major helicopter maintenance depot providing accommodation and maintenance facilities for Westland Sea Kings, Kamov Ka 27s and HAL Chetaks, adding up to 17 helicopters and meeting a task of over 4000 flying hours annually.

Units
Naval Air Squadrons based at INS Shikra include:
 INAS 321, a search and rescue and logistics squadron, operating HAL Chetak helicopters
 INAS 330, an anti-submarine warfare squadron, operating Westland Sea King Mk.42B helicopters

See also
 Indian navy 
 List of Indian Navy bases
 List of active Indian Navy ships

 Integrated commands and units
 Armed Forces Special Operations Division
 Defence Cyber Agency
 Integrated Defence Staff
 Integrated Space Cell
 Indian Nuclear Command Authority
 Indian Armed Forces
 Special Forces of India

 Other lists
 Strategic Forces Command
 List of Indian Air Force stations
 List of Indian Navy bases
 India's overseas military bases

References

Shikra